The following radio stations broadcast on AM frequency 1590 kHz: 1590 AM is a Regional broadcast frequency.

Argentina
 LRI434 in Dolores, Buenos Aires.
 Serodino in Serodino, Santa Fe.
 Stentor in Buenos Aires.

Colombia
HJIP at Envigado

Mexico
 XEVOZ-AM in Mexico City, licensed in Los Reyes Acaquilpan, State of Mexico

United States

References

Lists of radio stations by frequency